David Vreeland Kenyon (September 10, 1930 – March 31, 2015) was a United States district judge of the United States District Court for the Central District of California.

Education and career

Born in San Marino, California, Kenyon received a Bachelor of Arts degree from University of California, Berkeley in 1952. He received a Juris Doctor from the USC Gould School of Law in 1957. He was a United States Marine Corps Infantry Officer from 1953 to 1954. He was a law clerk for Judge Ernest Allen Tolin of the United States District Court for the Central District of California from 1957 to 1958. He was in private practice of law in Los Angeles, California from 1958 to 1959. He was house counsel for Metro-Goldwyn-Mayer from 1959 to 1960. He was house counsel for National Theatres and Television, Inc. from 1960 to 1961. He was in private practice of law in Los Angeles from 1961 to 1971. He was a judge of the Municipal Court of Los Angeles from 1971 to 1972. He was a judge of the Los Angeles County Superior Court from 1972 to 1980.

Federal judicial service

Kenyon was nominated by President Jimmy Carter on June 20, 1980, to a seat on the United States District Court for the Central District of California vacated by Judge Albert Lee Stephens Jr. He was confirmed by the United States Senate on September 29, 1980, and received his commission on September 30, 1980. He assumed senior status on October 27, 1995. His service was terminated on July 31, 1997, due to his retirement.

Notable case

One of the first cases over which Kenyon presided was a dispute over ownership of the Marvel Comics character, Howard the Duck. On August 29, 1980, after learning of Marvel's efforts to license Howard for use in film and broadcast media, creator Steve Gerber filed a copyright infringement lawsuit against Marvel corporate parent Cadence Industries and other parties, alleging that he was the sole owner of the character. This was one of the first highly publicized creator's rights cases in American comics, and attracted support from major industry figures. The lawsuit was settled on September 24, 1982, with Gerber acknowledging that his work on the character was done as work-for-hire and that Marvel parent Cadence Industries owned “all right, title and interest” to Howard the Duck and the Howard material he had produced. On November 5, 1982, Kenyon approved the motion and dismissed the case.

Death

Kenyon died on March 31, 2015.

References

Sources
 

1930 births
2015 deaths
California state court judges
Judges of the United States District Court for the Central District of California
United States district court judges appointed by Jimmy Carter
20th-century American judges
United States Marine Corps officers
USC Gould School of Law alumni
University of California, Berkeley alumni
Superior court judges in the United States
People from San Marino, California